The 2002 NCAA Skiing Championships were contested at the Alyeska Resort in Girdwood, Alaska as part of the 49th annual NCAA-sanctioned ski tournament to determine the individual and team national champions of men's and women's collegiate slalom and cross-country skiing in the United States.

Two-time defending champions Denver, coached by Kurt Smitz, again won the team championship, the Pioneers' third co-ed title and seventeenth overall.

Venue

The championships were hosted at the Alyeska Resort in Girdwood, Alaska, with the University of Alaska Anchorage as hosts.

These were the second championships held in Alaska (1987 and 2002).

Program

Men's events
 Cross country, 20 kilometer freestyle
 Cross country, 10 kilometer classical
 Slalom
 Giant slalom

Women's events
 Cross country, 15 kilometer freestyle
 Cross country, 5 kilometer classical
 Slalom
 Giant slalom

Team scoring

 DC – Defending champions
 Debut team appearance

See also
 List of NCAA skiing programs

References

2002 in Alaska
NCAA Skiing Championships
2002 in alpine skiing
2002 in cross-country skiing
NCAA Skiing Championships
College sports in Alaska
Skiing in Alaska